Controller General of Defence Finance is a department of the Prime Minister's Office that is responsible for the finances and salaries of Bangladesh Defence Forces and is located in Dhaka, Bangladesh.

History
The organization followed the  Controller General Defence Finance Procedure Manual of 1955 till 2007 when it was updated. It functions as a wing of Office of the Comptroller and Auditor General. The department is headed by a civil servant.

References

Government agencies of Bangladesh
1971 establishments in Bangladesh
Organisations based in Dhaka
Government finances in Bangladesh
Military pay and benefits